Lieutenant General  David "Dave" Stapleton DSM (26 September 1937 - 13 June 2016), was an Irish army general officer who served as Chief of Staff of the Irish Defence Forces and previously as Force Commander of UNDOF in the Golan Heights.

Early life
Stapleton was born in Clonmel, County Tipperary, Ireland on 26 September 1937, where he attentended the local Christian Brothers school.

Military career
He joined the Irish Defence Forces Cadet School in 1955 and was commissioned into the Supply and Transport Corps.  During a forty five year long career he held the senior positions of Commander 6th Infantry Brigade, Director of the Transport Corps, Quartermaster General, Force Commander UNDOF and Chief of Staff.

Personal life
He was married to Maureen and had four children. Stapleton died at his home in Newbridge on 13 June 2016.

References

1937 births
2016 deaths
Irish Army generals
Military personnel from County Tipperary